Uralsky (Ural) is a rural locality (a village) in Almukhametovsky Selsoviet, Abzelilovsky District, Bashkortostan, Russia. The population was 77 as of 2010. There are 2 streets.

Geography 
Uralsky is located 84 km southeast of Askarovo (the district's administrative centre) by road. Tashkazgan is the nearest rural locality.

References 

Rural localities in Abzelilovsky District